The list of early modern universities in Europe comprises all universities that existed in the early modern age (1501–1800) in Europe. It also includes short-lived foundations and educational institutions whose university status is a matter of debate. The operation of the degree-awarding university with its corporate organization and relative autonomy, which had emerged in the Christian medieval world, was continued into the new era. The number of universities which had been in existence at one time during the period rose from around eighty medieval universities to nearly two hundred. While the universitas arrived in Eastern Europe as far as Moscow, many were established further west either by the new Protestant powers or the Catholic Counter-Reformation spearheaded by the Jesuits. At the same time, the Spanish founded colonial universities and the British colonial colleges in the New World, thus heralding the spread of the university as the center of higher learning around the globe (see List of oldest universities).

Definition 
A short definition of the university and its defining characteristics as they evolved in the medieval and early modern era is offered by the multi-volume History of the University in Europe of the European University Association:

List of universities existing in the early modern age, but created before 

The list is sorted by the date of recognition. Note that the date of recognition is not necessarily the date of creation : for example, a community of teachers and students existed per se in Paris during the 11th century. At places where more than one university was established, the name of the institution is given in brackets.

11th century

12th century

13th century

14th century

15th century

List of universities created in the early modern age

16th century

17th century

18th century

See also 
 History of European research universities

Notes

References

Citations

Sources 

 Frijhoff, Willem: "Patterns", in: Ridder-Symoens, Hilde de (ed.): A History of the University in Europe. Vol. II: Universities in Early Modern Europe (1500–1800), Cambridge University Press, 1996, pp. 43–113 (80–89)
 Pécsi Tudományegyetem: University of Pécs, 1367, Eds.: Harka, Glass. Pécs: UP, (2007). 
 Fényes, Miklós: Középkori egyetemek Magyarországon, A Pécsi Egyetem története, in: Bibliographie internationale l'histoire des Universités, II, Genève, Librairie Droz, (1976).
 Jílek, Jubor (ed.): "Historical Compendium of European Universities/Répertoire Historique des Universités Européennes", Standing Conference of Rectors, Presidents and Vice-Chancellors of the European Universities (CRE), Geneva 1984.
 Roberts, John; Rodriguez Cruz, Agueda M.; Herbst, Jürgen: "Exporting Models", in: Ridder-Symoens, Hilde de (ed.): A History of the University in Europe. Vol. II: Universities in Early Modern Europe (1500–1800), Cambridge University Press, 1996, pp. 256–284.
 Rüegg, Walter: "Foreword. The University as a European Institution", in: Ridder-Symoens, Hilde de (ed.): A History of the University in Europe. Vol. I: Universities in the Middle Ages, Cambridge University Press, 1992, pp. XIX–XX.

Further reading 
 Rüegg, Walter (ed.): A History of the University in Europe. Vol. III: Universities in the Nineteenth and Early Twentieth Centuries (1800–1945), Cambridge University Press, 2004, 
 Rüegg, Walter (ed.): A History of the University in Europe. Vol. IV: Universities Since 1945, Cambridge University Press, 2011, 

 Universities